The 2017 Ohio Valley Conference women's soccer tournament was the postseason women's soccer tournament for the Ohio Valley Conference held from October 27 through November 5, 2017. The first round and quarterfinals of the tournament were held at campus sites hosted by the #3 and #4 seeds, while the semifinals and final took place at Cutchin Field in Murray, Kentucky. The eight-team single-elimination tournament consisted of four rounds based on seeding from regular season conference play. The SIU Edwardsville Cougars were the defending champions, but they were eliminated from the 2017 tournament with a 2–1 quarterfinal loss to the Eastern Kentucky Colonels. The Murray State Racers won the tournament with a 1–0 overtime win over Eastern Kentucky in the final. The conference tournament title was the third for the Murray State women's soccer program and the second for head coach Jeremy Groves.

Bracket

Schedule

First Round

Quarterfinals

Semifinals

Final

Statistics

Goalscorers 

2 Goals
 Miyah Watford – Murray State

1 Goal
 Nicole Collins – UT Martin
 McKenzie Dixon – Austin Peay
 Jordan Foster – Eastern Kentucky
 Esmie Gonzales – Southeast Missouri
 Caroline Hoefert – SIU Edwardsville
 Becca Jostes – SIU Edwardsville
 Maddi Karstens – Southeast Missouri
 Haley Kemper – Eastern Kentucky
 Peyton Roehnelt – SIU Edwardsville
 Katie Shaffer – Eastern Kentucky

References

External links

Ohio Valley Conference Women's Soccer Tournament
2016 Ohio Valley Conference women's soccer season